Lauretta is a feminine given name, which is probably derived from the name Laura. Notable people with the name include:

People with the forename
Lauretta Bender (1897–1987), American psychiatrist
Lauretta Hannon (born 1968), American writer
Lauretta Lamptey (born 1959), Ghanaian lawyer
Lauretta Masiero (1929–2010), Italian actress
Lauretta Ngcobo (1931–2015), South African writer
Lauretta Schimmoler (1900–1981), American aviator
Lauretta Vinciarelli (1943–2011), Italian architect
Lauretta of Saarbrücken (died 1271), German countess

People with the surname
Dante Lauretta (born 1970), American scientist

Fictional characters
Lauretta, fictional character in the book The Decameron by Giovanni Boccaccio
Lauretta, fictional character in the opera Gianni Schicchi by Giacomo Puccini

See also
Lauretta, Prince Edward Island
Laura (given name)
Loretta

Feminine given names
Italian feminine given names
English feminine given names